The Reverend Thomas Henry Espinell Compton Espin or T. H. E. C. Espin (28 May 1858 – 2 December 1934) was a British astronomer.  His father Thomas Espin was Chancellor of the Diocese of Chester and his mother was Elizabeth (née Jessop).

He became interested in astronomy by the appearance of "Coggia's Comet" (C/1874 H1), which he saw while attending Haileybury School. Espin then went to Exeter College, Oxford, from 1878 to 1881. He was ordained the following year.

He was an avid amateur astronomer and skilled observer.  In 1876, and while only eighteen years of age, he made the acquaintance of the aged Rev. Thomas William Webb (1807–1885) and assisted with an updated edition of his book Celestial Objects for Common Telescopes; after Webb's death in 1885 he published an expanded 5th (1893) and 6th (1917) editions of it. Also in 1885 Espin was appointed Curate of Wolsingham and he established an astronomical observatory there. In 1888 he transferred to Tow Law, where he served until he died, and brought the observatory with him. The observatory housed a -inch (438 mm) aperture reflecting telescope, which was later supplemented by a 24-inch (620 mm) aperture reflecting telescope. Espin discovered many nebulae, variable stars, and more than 2500 double stars.  He made many observations of the spectra of stars, and in particular he also did extensive searches for red stars (especially in his early career) and published a catalogue of them.  

He became a Fellow of the Royal Astronomical Society on 11 January 1878. From 1912 he was assisted in astronomical observing by William Milburn (1896–1982), the grandson of a family friend. Espin was awarded the Jackson-Gwilt Medal of the Royal Astronomical Society in 1913.

He discovered a nova in the constellation Lacerta in December 1910: this object was later known as DI Lacertae.

His other amateur scientific interests included botany, geology and the study of X-rays; his study of fossils caused him to disbelieve Darwin's theory of evolution.

He also served as a county magistrate for 35 years beginning in 1891 and was chairman of Stanhope and Wolsingham Sessions. He never married.

The crater Espin on the Moon is named after him.

References

External links

Obituaries
 MNRAS 95 (1935) 319–322
 Obs 58 (1935) 27–29
 JBAA 45 (1935) 128
 Nature 135 (1935) 257-258

1858 births
1934 deaths
19th-century British astronomers
19th-century English Anglican priests
20th-century English Anglican priests
Fellows of the Royal Astronomical Society
20th-century British astronomers